The Levi Merrill House is located in Eau Claire, Wisconsin.

History
Levi Merrill was a stonemason who owned the Mount Washington stone quarry, up the bluff behind the house. The house was listed on the National Register of Historic Places in 1985 and on the State Register of Historic Places in 1989.

References

Houses on the National Register of Historic Places in Wisconsin
National Register of Historic Places in Eau Claire County, Wisconsin
Houses in Eau Claire, Wisconsin
Neoclassical architecture in Wisconsin
Gothic Revival architecture in Wisconsin
Houses completed in 1873